The Earth Woman is a 1926 American silent drama film directed by Walter Lang. A print of this film was located in April 2021 in a film archive.

Cast
 Mary Alden as Martha Tilden (The Earth Woman)
 Priscilla Bonner as Sally
 Russell Simpson as Ezra Tilden
 Carroll Nye as Steve Tilden
 Joe Butterworth as Joe Tilden
 John Carr as Simon
 Johnnie Walker as John Mason (billed as Johnny Walker)
 William Scott as Mark McWade

See also
List of lost films

References

External links
 

1926 films
1926 drama films
Silent American drama films
American silent feature films
1920s English-language films
American black-and-white films
Films directed by Walter Lang
Lost American films
Associated Exhibitors films
1926 lost films
Lost drama films
1920s American films